The Kentucky Cup Sprint Stakes is an American Thoroughbred horse race run annually since 1994 at Turfway Park in Florence, Kentucky. Contested over a distance of six furlongs on Polytrack synthetic dirt, the Grade III event is open to three-year-old horses.

Contested in late September, previous winners Reraise and Cajun Beat went on to win the Breeders' Cup Sprint.

With the support of WinStar Farm, this race which was suspended in 2010 due to economic challenges, will return in 2011.

Records
Speed  record
 1:08.03 – Fatal Bullet (2008)

Most wins by a jockey
 3 – Pat Day (1997, 2001, 2002)

Most wins by a trainer
 3 – D. Wayne Lukas (1997, 2001, 2002)

Most wins by an owner
 2 – Overbrook Farm (2001, 2002)

Winners Stakes

References
 The Kentucky Cup Sprint Stakes at Pedigree Query
 Kentucky Cup Stakes restored by WinStar Farm

Graded stakes races in the United States
Flat horse races for three-year-olds
Recurring sporting events established in 1994
Turfway Park horse races
1994 establishments in Kentucky